Fox Sports was a Chilean pay television channel specialised on broadcasting sport events. The localised feed was launched in 11 November 2013, replacing Fox Sports Básico.

History 
Fox Sports Latin America was available in Chile as two simulcast feeds, which were "Fox Sports Básico" and "Fox Sports Premium", inheriting the Panamerican Sports Network's (PSN) commercial structure in that country after its demise in 2001 as PSN's owner, "Hicks, Muse, Tate & Furst", formed a joint venture with Fox Sports International named Panamerican Sports Holding (PSH), which in turn formed a joint venture with Liberty Media and Argentine company Torneos y Competencias named "Fox Pan American Sports" that took control of the Latin American Fox Sports channels from News Corporation. Thus, Fox Sports southern feed broadcasting from Argentina started airing on PSN's slots.

At the time, Fox Sports Premium was the intact broadcast of the Latin American channel broadcasting from Argentina, while Fox Sports Básico was a simulcast with no live programming, relegated to low-tier television packages.

In November 2013, the channel was launched replacing Fox Sports Básico with original programming produced in Chile. In 21 October 2014, Fox Sports Premium stopped being a mirror feed of Fox Sports LA and starts rebroadcasting Fox Sports Chile programming with live events. 7 months later, on 4 May 2015, Fox Sports Premium was rebranded as Fox Sports 1.

Until December 2019, the Fox Sports channels were bundled into a premium pack labelled "Fox Sports Premium" which consisted on Chilean-made Fox Sports 1 and Latin American Fox Sports 2 and 3. It was the only country in the region to sell the network this way.

Due to the acquisition of 21st Century Fox by The Walt Disney Company, Disney took control of Fox Sports. As one of its conditions was to relinquish the network due to anti-monopoly policies by the governments of Mexico and Brazil (Disney already owned ESPN which broadcast 3 channels in Latin America), it announced to close Fox Sports' Chilean, Colombian, Uruguayan and Peruvian local feeds. Fox Sports Chile and Fox Sports 1 closed down on 15 December 2019, with Fox Sports 1 being replaced by Fox Sports Latin America, while Fox Sports Chile turning into a Fox Sports LA feed with no live programming again.

Programming rights

Events and competitions that were seen on Fox Sports Chile.

Football 
 Copa Libertadores (Fox Sports 1)
 UEFA Champions League (Fox Sports 1)
 UEFA Europa League (Fox Sports 1)
 European Supercup 
 Bundesliga (Fox Sports 1)

Motorsports 
 Dakar Rally
 Formula One (Fox Sports 1)
 Rally Mobil

Gridiron football
 National Football League (Fox Sports 1)

See also
 Fox Sports International
 Fox Sports Latin America

References 
 http://www.lanacion.cl/fox-sports-lanzara-programa-estelar-en-chile/noticias/2013-10-09/133932.html
 http://buscador.emol.com/emol/Fernando+Gualda
 http://www.skyscraperlife.com/latin-bar/86691-nace-fox-sports-chile-17.html

Television stations in Chile
Latin American cable television networks
Chile
Spanish-language television stations
Television channels and stations established in 2013
Television channels and stations disestablished in 2019